The following is a list of school districts in Illinois.  , there were 852 public school districts, including 368 elementary districts, 97 high school districts, 386 unit districts, and one Illinois Department of Juvenile Justice district, and two cooperative high schools.

These districts are organized by regions set by the Illinois State Board of Education and not by the actual county boundaries; school districts can cross county boundaries, and school districts with administrative headquarters and/or schools only in certain counties can include territory in one or more other counties that do not have schools operated by that district.

Region 01: Adams/Brown/Cass/Morgan/Pike/Scott ROE

Adams County

Payson Community Unit School District 1
Liberty Community Unit School District 2
Central Community Unit School District 3
Mendon Community Unit School District 4
Quincy Public School District 172
Quincy Area Vocational Technical Center

Brown County
Brown County Community Unit School District 1

Cass County

Beardstown Community Unit School District 15
Virginia Community Unit School District 64
A-C Central Community Unit School District 262 (Ashland-Chandlerville)

Morgan County

Franklin Community Unit School District 1
Waverly Community Unit School District 6
Meredosia-Chambersburg Community Unit School District 11
Triopia Community Unit School District 27
Jacksonville School District 117

Pike County

Pleasant Hill Community Unit School District 3
Griggsville-Perry Community Unit School District 4
Pikeland Community Unit School District 10
Western Community Unit School District 12

Scott County

Winchester Community Unit School District 1
Scott-Morgan Community Unit School District 2

Region 03: Bond/Christian/Effingham/Fayette/Montgomery ROE

Bond County

Mulberry Grove Community Unit School District 1
Bond County Community Unit School District 2

Christian County

Morrisonville Community Unit School District 1
Taylorville Community Unit School District 3
Edinburg Community Unit School District 4
Pana Community Unit School District 8
South Fork School District 14

Effingham County

Altamont Community Unit School District 10
Beecher City Community Unit School District 20
Dieterich Community Unit School District 30
Effingham Community Unit School District 40
Teutopolis Community Unit School District 50

Fayette County

Brownstown Community Unit School District 201
Saint Elmo Community Unit School District 202
Vandalia Community Unit School District 203
Ramsey Community Unit School District 204

Montgomery County

Panhandle Community Unit School District 2
Hillsboro Community Unit School District 3
Litchfield Community Unit School District 12
Nokomis Community Unit School District 22

Region 04: Boone/Winnebago ROE

Boone County

Belvidere Community Unit School District 100
North Boone Community Unit School District 200
Boone County Special Education Cooperative

Winnebago County

Harlem School District 122
Kinnikinnick Community Consolidated School District 131
Prairie Hill Community Consolidated School District 133
Shirland Community Consolidated School District 134
Rockton School District 140
Rockford Public School District 205
Hononegah Community High School District 207
South Beloit Community Unit School District 320, also known as "County of Winnebago School District 320"
Pecatonica Community Unit School District 321
Durand Community Unit School District 322
Winnebago Community Unit School District 323

Region 05: North Cook ISC 1

Cook County

Community Consolidated School District 15 — based in Palatine
Wheeling Community Consolidated School District 21
Prospect Heights School District 23
Arlington Heights School District 25
River Trails School District 26
Northbrook School District 27
Northbrook School District 28
Sunset Ridge School District 29
Northbrook/Glenview School District 30
West Northfield School District 31
Glenview Community Consolidated School District 34
Glencoe School District 35
Winnetka School District 36
Avoca School District 37
Kenilworth School District 38
Wilmette Public Schools District 39
Community Consolidated School District 54 — based in Schaumburg
Mount Prospect School District 57
Community Consolidated School District 59 — based in Arlington Heights
Community Consolidated School District 62 — based in Des Plaines
East Maine School District 63
Park Ridge-Niles School District 64
Evanston/Skokie School District 65
Golf School District 67
Skokie School District 68
Skokie-Morton School District 69
Morton Grove School District 70
Niles Elementary School District 71
Fairview School District 72
East Prairie School District 73
Skokie School District 73½
Lincolnwood School District 74
Evanston Township High School District 202
New Trier Township High School District 203
Maine Township High School District 207
Township High School District 211 — serves Palatine and Schaumburg Townships
Township High School District 214 — based in Arlington Heights
Niles Township High School District 219
Northfield Township High School District 225

Region 06: West Cook ISC 2

Cook County

Rosemont Elementary School District 78
Pennoyer School District 79
Norridge School District 80
Schiller Park School District 81
Mannheim School District 83
Franklin Park School District 84
Rhodes School District 84½
River Grove School District 85½
Union Ridge School District 86
Berkeley School District 87
Bellwood School District 88
Maywood-Melrose Park-Broadview School District 89
River Forest Public Schools District 90
Forest Park School District 91
Lindop School District 92
Westchester Public School District 92½
Hillside School District 93
Komarek School District 94
Brookfield-Lagrange Park School District 95
Riverside School District 96
Oak Park Elementary School District 97
Berwyn North School District 98
Cicero School District 99
South Berwyn School District 100
Western Springs School District 101
LaGrange Elementary School District 102
Lyons School District 103
LaGrange School District 105 South
LaGrange Highlands School District 106
Pleasantdale School District 107
Oak Park and River Forest High School District 200
J. Sterling Morton High School District 201
Lyons Township High School District 204
Riverside-Brookfield Township District 208
Proviso Township High Schools District 209
Leyden Community High School District 212
Ridgewood Community High School District 234
Elmwood Park Community Unit School District 401

Region 07: South Cook ISC 4

Cook County

Cook County School District 104 — based in Summit
Willow Springs School District 108
Indian Springs School District 109
Central Stickney School District 110
Burbank School District 111
Lemont-Bromberek Combined School District 113A
North Palos School District 117
Palos School District 118
Ridgeland School District 122
Oak Lawn-Hometown School District 123
Evergreen Park Elementary School District 124
Atwood Heights School District 125
Alsip-Hazelgreen-Oak Lawn School District 126
Worth School District 127
Chicago Ridge School District 127½
Palos Heights School District 128
Cook County School District 130 — based in Blue Island
Calumet Public School District 132
General George Patton School District 133
Orland School District 135
Kirby School District 140
Forest Ridge School District 142
Midlothian School District 143
Posen-Robbins School District 143½
Prairie-Hills Elementary School District 144
Arbor Park School District 145
Tinley Park Community Consolidated School District 146
West Harvey-Dixmoor Public School District 147
Dolton Riverdale School District 148
Dolton School District 149
South Holland School District 150
South Holland School District 151
Harvey School District 152
Hazel Crest School District 152½
Homewood School District 153
Thornton School District 154
Burnham School District 154½
Calumet City School District 155
Lincoln Elementary School District 156
Hoover-Schrum Memorial School District 157
Lansing School District 158
Elementary School District 159 — based in Matteson, but not District 162
Country Club Hills School District 160
Flossmoor School District 161
Matteson School District 162 — not to be confused with District 159, also based in Matteson
Park Forest School District 163
Brookwood School District 167
Community Consolidated School District 168 — based in Sauk Village
Ford Heights School District 169
Chicago Heights School District 170
Sunnybrook School District 171
Sandridge School District 172
Steger School District 194
Thornton Township High School District 205
Bloom Township High School District 206
Lemont Township High School District 210
Thornton Fractional Township High School District 215
Argo Community High School District 217
Community High School District 218 — based in Oak Lawn
Reavis Township High School District 220
Rich Township High School District 227
Bremen Community High School District 228
Oak Lawn Community High School District 229
Consolidated High School District 230 — based in Orland Park
Evergreen Park Community High School District 231
Homewood Flossmoor Community High School District 233
Argo Evergreen Park Reavis Oak Lawn Special Education Cooperative

Region 08: Carroll/Jo Daviess/Stephenson ROE

Carroll County

Eastland Community Unit School District 308
West Carroll Community Unit School District 314
Chadwick-Milledgeville Community Unit School District 399

Jo Daviess County

East Dubuque Unit School District 119
Galena Unit School District 120
Warren Community Unit School District 205
Stockton Community Unit School District 206
River Ridge Community Unit School District 210
Scales Mound Community Unit School District 211

Stephenson County

Freeport School District 145
Pearl City Community Unit School District 200
Dakota Community Unit School District 201
Lena-Winslow Community Unit School District 202
Orangeville Community Unit School District 203

Region 09: Champaign/Ford ROE

Champaign County

Fisher Community Unit School District 1
Mahomet-Seymour Community Unit School District 3
Champaign Unit 4 School District
Tolono Community Unit School District 7
Heritage Community Unit School District 8
Urbana School District 116
Thomasboro Community Consolidated School District 130
Rantoul City School District 137
Ludlow Community Consolidated School District 142
St. Joseph Community Consolidated School District 169
Gifford Community Consolidated School District 188
Rantoul Township High School District 193
Prairieview-Ogden Community Consolidated School District 197
Saint Joseph Ogden Community High School District 305

Ford County

Gibson City-Melvin-Sibley Community Unit School District 5
Paxton-Buckley-Loda Community Unit School District 10

Region 11: Clark/Coles/Cumberland/Douglas/Edgar/Moultrie/Shelby ROE

Clark County

Marshall Community Unit School District C-2
Martinsville Community Unit School District C-3
Casey-Westfield Community Unit School District C-4

Coles County

Charleston Community Unit School District 1
Mattoon Community Unit School District 2
Oakland Community Unit School District 5

Cumberland County

Neoga Community Unit School District 3
Cumberland Community Unit School District 77

Douglas County

Tuscola Community Unit School District 301
Villa Grove Community Unit School District 302
Arthur Community Unit School District 305
Arcola Community Unit School District 306

Edgar County

Shiloh Community Unit School District 1
Kansas Community Unit School District 3
Paris Community Unit School District No. 4 — grades 9-12 served by Paris Cooperative High School since 2009
Edgar County Community Unit District 6
Paris Union School District 95 — grades 9-12 served by Paris Cooperative High School since 2009

Moultrie County

Sullivan Community Unit School District 300
Okaw Valley Community Unit School District 302

Shelby County

Windsor Community Unit School District 1
Cowden-Herrick Community Unit School District 3A
Shelbyville Community Unit School District 4
Stewardson-Strasburg Community Unit District 5A
Central A&M Community Unit District 21

Region 12: Clay/Crawford/Jasper/Lawrence/Richland ROE

Clay County

Clay City Community Unit School District 10
North Clay Community Unit School District 25
Flora Community Unit School District 35

Crawford County

Hutsonville Community Unit School District 1
Robinson Community Unit School District 2
Palestine Community Unit School District 3
Oblong Community Unit School District 4

Jasper County
Jasper County Community Unit School District 1

Lawrence County

Red Hill Community Unit School District 10
Lawrence County Community Unit School District 20

Richland County
Richland County Community Unit School District 1 — formerly East Richland Community Unit School District 1

Region 13: Clinton/Jefferson/Marion/Washington ROE

Clinton County

Carlyle Community Unit School District 1
Wesclin Community Unit School District 3
Breese Elementary School District 12
Saint Rose School District 14-15
Aviston School District 21
Willow Grove School District 46
Bartelso School District 57
Germantown School District 60
Damiansville School District 62
Albers School District 63
Central Community High School District 71
North Wamac School District 186

Jefferson County

Waltonville Community Unit School District 1
Rome Community Consolidated School District 2
Field Community Consolidated School District 3
Opdyke-Belle Rive Community Consolidated School District 5
Grand Prairie Community Consolidated School District 6
McClellan Community Consolidated School District 12
Summersville School District 79
Mount Vernon School District 80
Bethel School District 82
Farrington Community Consolidated School District 99
Spring Garden School District 178
Mount Vernon Township High School District 201
Woodlawn Unit School District 209
Bluford Unit School District 318

Marion County

Raccoon Consolidated School District 1
Kell Consolidated School District 2
Iuka Community Consolidated School District 7
Selmaville Community Consolidated School District 10
Patoka Community Unit School District 100
Salem School District 111
Central City School District 133
Centralia School District 135
Centralia High School District 200
South Central Community Unit District 401
Sandoval Community Unit School District 501
Salem Community High School District 600
Odin Public School District 722

Washington County

Oakdale Community Consolidated School District 1
West Washington County Community Unit District 10
Irvington Community Consolidated School District 11
Ashley Community Consolidated School District 15
Nashville Community Consolidated School District 49
Nashville Community High School District 99

Region 15: City of Chicago

Cook County
City of Chicago School District 299

Region 16: DeKalb ROE

DeKalb County

Genoa Kingston Community Unit School District 424
Indian Creek Community Unit District 425 — formerly Shabbona Community Unit School District 425
Hiawatha Community Unit School District 426
Sycamore Community Unit School District 427
DeKalb Community Unit School District 428
Hinckley Big Rock Community Unit School District 429
Sandwich Community Unit School District 430
Somonauk Community Unit School District 432

Region 17: DeWitt/Livingston/Logan/McLean ROE

DeWitt County

Clinton Community Unit School District 15
Blue Ridge Community Unit School District 18

Livingston County

Woodland Community Unit School District 5
Tri-Point Community Unit School District 6-J
Prairie Central Community Unit School District 8 — including Prairie Central High School
Flanagan-Cornell Unit 74
Pontiac Township High School District 90
Dwight Township High School District 230
Dwight Common School District 232
Rooks Creek Community Consolidated School District 425
Cornell Community Consolidated School District 426
Pontiac Community Consolidated School District 429
Odell Community Consolidated School District 435
Saunemin Community Consolidated School District 438

Logan County

Hartsburg Emden Community Unit School District 21
Mt. Pulaski Community Unit School District 23
Lincoln Elementary School District 27
Chester-East Lincoln Community Consolidated School District 61
New Holland-Middletown Elementary School District 88
West Lincoln-Broadwell Elementary School District 92
Lincoln Community High School District 404

McLean County

Le Roy Community Unit School District 2
Tri-Valley Community Unit School District 3
Heyworth Community Unit School District 4
McLean County Unit District No. 5
Lexington Community Unit School District 7
Olympia Community Unit School District 16
Ridgeview Community Unit School District 19
Bloomington School District 87

Region 19: DuPage ROE

DuPage County

Bensenville School District 2
Addison School District 4
Wood Dale School District 7
Itasca School District 10
Medinah School District 11
Roselle School District 12
Bloomingdale School District 13
Marquardt School District 15 — based in Glendale Heights
Queen Bee School District 16 — based in Glendale Heights
Keeneyville School District 20
Benjamin School District 25
West Chicago Elementary School District 33
Winfield School District 34
Glen Ellyn School District 41
Lombard School District 44
School District 45, DuPage County — based in Villa Park
Salt Creek School District 48 — based in Villa Park
Butler School District 53
Downers Grove Grade School District 58
Maercker School District 60
Darien School District 61
Gower School District 62
Cass School District 63
Center Cass School District 66
Woodridge School District 68
Hinsdale Township High School District 86
Glenbard Township High School District 87
DuPage High School District 88
Community Consolidated School District 89 — based in Glen Ellyn
Community Consolidated School District 93 — based in Bloomingdale
Community High School District 94 — based in West Chicago
Community High School District 99 — based in Downers Grove
Fenton Community High School District 100
Lake Park Community High School District 108
Community Consolidated School District 180 — based in Burr Ridge
Hinsdale Community Consolidated School District 181
Community Unit School District 200 — based in Wheaton
Westmont Community Unit School District 201
Lisle Community Unit School District 202
Naperville Community Unit School District 203
Indian Prairie School District 204 — based in Aurora
Elmhurst Community Unit School District 205

Region 20: Edwards/Gallatin/Hamilton/Hardin/Pope/Saline/Wabash/Wayne/White ROE

Edwards County
Edwards County Community Unit School District 1

Gallatin County
Gallatin Community Unit School District 7

Hamilton County
Hamilton County Community Unit School District 10

Hardin County
Hardin County Community Unit School District 1

Pope County
Pope County Community Unit School District 1

Saline County

Galatia Community Unit School District 1
Carrier Mills-Stonefort Community Unit School District 2
Harrisburg Community Unit School District 3
Eldorado Community Unit School District 4

Wabash County

Allendale Community Consolidated School District 17
Wabash Community Unit School District 348

Wayne County

New Hope Community Consolidated School District 6
Geff Community Consolidated School District 14
Jasper Community Consolidated School District 17
Wayne City Community Unit School District 100
Fairfield Public School District 112
North Wayne Community Unit School District 200
Fairfield Community High School District 225

White County

Grayville Community Unit School District 1
Norris City-Omaha-Enfield Community Unit School District 3
Carmi-White County Community Unit School District 5

Region 21: Franklin/Johnson/Massac/Williamson ROE

Franklin County

Benton Community Consolidated School District 47
Akin Community Consolidated School District 91
Christopher Unit School District 99
Benton Consolidated High School District 103
Ewing Northern Community Consolidated District 115
Frankfort Community Unit School District 168
Thompsonville Community Unit School District 174
Zeigler-Royalton Community Unit School District 188
Sesser-Valier Community Unit School District 196

Johnson County

Goreville Community Unit District 1
New Simpson Hill School District 32
Buncombe Consolidated School District 43
Vienna School District 55
Cypress School District 64
Vienna High School District 133

Massac County

Massac Unit District 1
Joppa-Maple Grove Unit District 38

Williamson County

Johnston City Community Unit School District 1
Marion Community Unit School District 2
Crab Orchard Community Unit School District 3
Herrin Community Unit School District 4
Carterville Community Unit School District 5

Region 24: Grundy/Kendall ROE

Grundy County

Coal City Community Unit School District 1
Mazon-Verona-Kinsman Elementary School District 2C
Nettle Creek Community Consolidated School District 24C
Morris School District 54
Saratoga Community Consolidated School District 60C
Gardner Community Consolidated School District 72C
Gardner-South Wilmington Township High School District 73
South Wilmington Community Consolidated School District 74
Braceville School District 75
Morris Community High School District 101
Minooka Community High School District 111
Minooka Community Consolidated School District 201

Kendall County

Newark Community High School District 18
Newark Community Consolidated School District 66
Plano Community Unit School District 88
Lisbon Community Consolidated School District 90
Yorkville Community Unit School District 115
Oswego Community Unit School District 308

Region 26: Hancock/Fulton/Schuyler/McDonough ROE

Fulton County

Astoria Community Unit School District 1
Vermont Ipava Table Grove Community Unit School District 2 — known as V.I.T.
Community Unit School District 3, Fulton County — Cuba schools, also known as North Fulton
Spoon River Valley Community Unit School District 4
Canton Union School District 66
Lewistown Community Unit School District 97

Hancock County

Illini West High School District 307
Warsaw Community Unit School District 316 — deactivated into tuition for grades 7-8 to Nauvoo-Colusa Community Unit School District 325 in 2008
Carthage Elementary School District 317
Nauvoo–Colusa Community Unit School District 325 — deactivated into tuition for graded 9-12 to Warsaw Community Unit School District 316 in 2008
Dallas Elementary School District 327
Hamilton Community Consolidated School District 328
Southeastern Community Unit School District 337
La Harpe Community School District 347

McDonough County

West Prairie Community Unit School District 103
Bushnell Prairie City Community Unit School District 170
Macomb Community Unit School District 185

Schuyler County
Schuyler-Industry Community Unit School District 5

Region 28: Bureau/Henry/Stark ROE

Bureau County

Ohio Community Consolidated School District 17
Malden Community Consolidated School District 84
Ladd Community Consolidated School District 94
Dalzell School District 98
Spring Valley Community Consolidated School District 99
DePue Unit School District 103
Princeton Elementary School District 115
La Moille Community Unit School District 303
Bureau Valley Community Unit School District 340
Princeton High School District 500
Hall High School District 502
Ohio Community High School District 505

Henry County

Colona School District 190
Orion Community Unit School District 223
Galva Community Unit School District 224
AlWood Community Unit School District 225 (Alpha-Woodhull)
Annawan Community Unit School District 226
Cambridge Community Unit School District 227
Geneseo Community Unit School District 228
Kewanee Community Unit School District 229
Wethersfield Community Unit School District 230

Stark County

Bradford Community Unit School District 1 — deactivated into tuition for grades 9-12 to Henry-Senachwine Community School District 5, Stark County Community Unit School District 100 and Bureau Valley Community Unit School District 340 in 2001
Stark County Community Unit School District 100

Region 30: Alexander/Jackson/Pulaski/Perry/Union ROE

Alexander County

Cairo Unified School District 1
Egyptian Community Unit School District 5

Jackson County

Desoto Consolidated School District 86
Carbondale Elementary School District 95
Giant City Community Consolidated School District 130
Unity Point Community Consolidated School District 140
Carbondale Community High School District 165
Trico Community Unit School District 176
Murphysboro Community Unit School District 186
Elverado Community Unit School District 196

Perry County

Tamaroa School District 5
Pinckneyville School District 50
Pinckneyville Community High School District 101
Community Consolidated School District 204 (Pinckneyville)
Du Quoin Community Unit School District 300

Pulaski County

Century Community Unit School District 100
Meridian Community Unit School District 101

Union County

Lick Creek Community Consolidated School District 16
Cobden Unit School District 17
Anna Community Consolidated School District 37
Jonesboro Community Consolidated School District 43, also sometimes listed as "Jonesboro Elementary School District" or "County of Union School District No. 43"
Dongola Unit School District 66
Anna Jonesboro Community High School District 81
Shawnee Community Unit School District 84

Region 31: Kane ROE

Kane County

Elgin Area School District U46 (a Unit school district) — also serves areas in Cook and DuPage counties
Batavia Unit School District 101
West Aurora Public School District 129
East Aurora Public School District 131
Community Unit School District 300 — also serves areas in McHenry County
Central Community Unit School District 301
Kaneland Community Unit School District 302 — also serves areas in DeKalb County
St. Charles Community Unit School District 303 — also serves areas in DuPage County
Geneva Community Unit School District 304

Region 32: Iroquois/Kankakee ROE

Iroquois County

Donovan Community Unit School District 3
Central Community Unit School District 4
Cissna Park Community Unit School District 6
Iroquois County Community Unit School District 9
Iroquois West Community Unit School District 10
Milford Area Public Schools District 124
Crescent Iroquois Community Unit School District 249 — deactivated into tuition for grades 9-12 to Cissna Park Community Unit School District 6, Iroquois County Community Unit School District 9 and Iroquois West Community Unit School District 10 in 2009

Kankakee County

Momence Community Unit School District 1
Herscher Community Unit School District 2
Manteno Community Unit School District 5 — small portion extends into Wesley Township, Will County
Grant Park Community Unit School District 6
Bourbonnais School District 53
Bradley Elementary School District 61
Kankakee School District 111
St. Anne Community Consolidated School District 256
St. George Community Consolidated School District 258
Pembroke Community Consolidated School District 259
St. Anne Community High School District 302
Bradley-Bourbonnais Community High School District 307

Region 33: Henderson/Knox/Mercer/Warren ROE

Henderson County
West Central Community Unit School District 235

Knox County

Knoxville Community Unit School District 202
Galesburg Community Unit School District 205
R.O.W.V.A. Community Unit School District 208 (Rio, Oneida, Wataga, Victoria and Altona)
Williamsfield Community Unit School District 210
Abingdon-Avon Community Unit School District 276 — also covers parts of Fulton County

Mercer County
Mercer County School District 404

Warren County

Monmouth-Roseville Community Unit School District 238
United Community Unit School District 304

Region 34: Lake ROE

Lake County

Winthrop Harbor School District 1
Beach Park Community Consolidated School District 3
Zion Elementary School District 6
Millburn Community Consolidated School District 24
Emmons School District 33
Antioch Community Consolidated School District 34
Grass Lake School District 36
Gavin School District 37
Big Hollow School District 38
Lake Villa Community Consolidated School District 41
Community Consolidated School District 46 — based in Grayslake
Woodland Community Consolidated School District 50
Gurnee School District 56
Waukegan Community Unit School District 60
Lake Bluff Elementary School District 65
Lake Forest School District 67
Oak Grove School District 68
Libertyville District 70
Rondout School District 72
Hawthorn Community Consolidated School District 73
Mundelein Elementary School District 75
Diamond Lake School District 76
Fremont School District 79
Community Unit School District 95 — Lake Zurich
Kildeer Countryside Community Consolidated School District 96
Aptakisic-Tripp Community Consolidated School District 102
Lincolnshire-Prairie View School District 103
Bannockburn Elementary School District 106
Deerfield School District 109
North Shore School District 112
Township High School District 113 — headquartered in Highland Park
Fox Lake Grade School District 114
Lake Forest Community High School District 115
Round Lake Area Schools District 116
Community High School District 117 — Antioch Community High School and Lakes Community High School
Wauconda Community Unit School District 118
Mundelein Consolidated High School District 120
Warren Township High School District 121
Grant Community High School District 124
Adlai E. Stevenson High School District 125
Zion-Benton Township High School District 126
Grayslake Community High School District 127
Community High School District 128 — Libertyville High School and Vernon Hills High School
North Chicago School District 187
Barrington Community Unit School District 220 — also covers areas in Cook County

Region 35: LaSalle/Marshall/Putnam ROE

LaSalle County

Leland Community Unit School District 1
Serena Community Unit School District 2
Earlville Community Unit School District 9
Streator Township High School District 40
Streator Elementary School District 44
Allen-Otter Creek Community Consolidated School District 65
Tonica Community Consolidated School District 79
Deer Park Community Consolidated School District 82
Grand Ridge Community Consolidated School District 95
LaSalle-Peru Township High School District 120
LaSalle Elementary School District 122
Peru Elementary School District 124
Oglesby Elementary School District 125
Ottawa Township High School District 140
Ottawa Elementary School District 141
Marseilles Elementary School District 150
Seneca Township High School District 160
Seneca Community Consolidated School District 170
Dimmick Community Consolidated School District 175 — from 2017 also includes the territory of dissolved Cherry School District 92
Waltham Community Consolidated School District 185
Wallace Community Consolidated School District 195
Miller Township Community Consolidated School District 210
Rutland Community Consolidated School District 230
Mendota Township High School District 280
Mendota Consolidated Community School District 289
Lostant Community Unit School District 425 — deactivated into tuition for grades 9-12 to Fieldcrest Community Unit School District 6, Streator Township High School District 40, LaSalle-Pery Township High School District 120 and Putnam County Community Unit School District 535 in 1993

Marshall County

Henry-Senachwine Community Unit School District 5
Midland Community Unit School District 7

Putnam County
Putnam County Community Unit School District 535

Region 39: Macon/Piatt ROE

Macon County

Argenta-Oreana Community Unit School District 1
Maroa Forsyth Community Unit School District 2
Mt. Zion Community Unit School District 3
Sangamon Valley Community Unit School District 9
Warrensburg-Latham Community Unit District 11
Meridian Community Unit School District 15
Decatur School District 61

Piatt County

Bement Community Unit School District 5
Monticello Community Unit School District 25
DeLand-Weldon Community Unit School District 57
Cerro Gordo Community Unit School District 100

Region 40: Calhoun/Green/Jersey/Macoupin ROE

Calhoun County

Calhoun Community Unit School District 40
Brussels Community Unit School District 42

Greene County

Carrollton Community Unit School District 1
North Greene Community Unit School District 3
Greenfield Community Unit School District 10

Jersey County
Jersey Community Unit School District 100

Macoupin County

Carlinville Community Unit School District 1
Northwestern Community Unit School District 2
Mount Olive Community Unit School District 5
Staunton Community Unit School District 6
Gillespie Community Unit School District 7
Bunker Hill Community Unit School District 8
Southwestern Community Unit School District 9
North Mac Community Unit School District 34

Region 41: Madison ROE

Madison County

Roxana Community Unit School District 1
Triad Community Unit School District 2
Venice Community Unit School District 3 — deactivated into tuition for grades 9-12 to East Saint Louis School District 189 in 2004
Highland Community Unit School District 5
Edwardsville Community Unit School District 7
Bethalto Community Unit School District 8
Granite City Community Unit School District 9
Collinsville Community Unit School District 10
Alton Community Unit School District 11
Madison Community Unit School District 12
East Alton School District 13
East Alton-Wood River Community High School District 14
Wood River-Hartford Elementary School District 15

Region 44: McHenry ROE

McHenry County

Nippersink School District 2
Fox River Grove Consolidated School District 3
Johnsburg Community Unit School District 12
McHenry School District 15
Riley Community Consolidated School District 18
Alden Hebron School District 19
Cary Community Consolidated School District 26
Harrison School District 36
Prairie Grove Community School District 46
Crystal Lake Community Consolidated School District 47
Harvard Community Unit School District 50
Marengo Community High School District 154
Community High School District 155 — based in Crystal Lake
McHenry Community High School District 156
Richmond-Burton Community High School District 157
Consolidated School District 158 — headquartered in Algonquin; serving students in McHenry and Kane counties
Marengo-Union Elementary School District 165
Woodstock Community Unit School District 200

Region 45: Monroe/Randolph ROE

Monroe County

Valmeyer Community Unit School District 3
Columbia Community Unit School District 4
Waterloo Community Unit School District 5

Randolph County

Coulterville Unit School District 1
Chester Non-High School District 122
Red Bud Community Unit School District 132
Prairie du Rocher Community Consolidated School District 134
Steeleville Community Unit School District 138
Chester Community Unit School District 139
Sparta Community Unit School District 140

Region 47: Lee/Ogle/Whiteside ROE

Lee County

Dixon Unit School District 170 (also known as Dixon Public Schools)
Steward Elementary School District 220
Paw Paw Community Unit School District 271 — deactivated into tuition for grades 9-12 to Indian Creek Community Unit School District 425 in 2019
Amboy Community Unit School District 272
Ashton-Franklin Center Community Unit School District 275

Ogle County

Kings Consolidated School District 144
Creston Community Consolidated School District 161
Rochelle Township High School District 212 — also covers part of Lee and DeKalb counties
Oregon Community Unit School District 220
Forrestville Valley Community Unit School District 221
Polo Community Unit School District 222
Meridian Community Unit School District 223
Byron Community Unit School District 226
Rochelle Community Consolidated School District 231
Eswood Community Consolidated District 269 — also covers part of DeKalb County

Whiteside County

Erie Community Unit School District 1
River Bend Community Unit School District 2
Prophetstown-Lyndon-Tampico Community Unit School District 3
Sterling Community Unit School District 5
Morrison Community Unit School District 6
Rock Falls Elementary School District 13
East Coloma-Nelson Consolidated Elementary School District 20
Montmorency Community Consolidated School District 145
Rock Falls Township High School District 301

Region 48: Peoria ROE

Peoria County

Pleasant Valley School District 62
Norwood Elementary School District 63
Bartonville School District 66
Oak Grove School District 68
Pleasant Hill School District 69
Monroe School District 70
Peoria School District 150
Farmington Central Community Unit School District 265
Brimfield Community Unit School District 309
Limestone Community High School District 310
Limestone Walters Community Consolidated School District 316
Illinois Valley Central Unit District 321
Elmwood Community Unit School District 322
Dunlap Community Unit School District 323
Peoria Heights Community Unit School District 325
Princeville Community Unit School District 326
Illini Bluffs Community Unit School District 327
Hollis Consolidated School District 328

Region 49: Rock Island ROE

Rock Island County

Hampton School District 29
United Township High School District 30
Silvis School District 34
Carbon Cliff-Barstow School District 36
East Moline School District 37
Moline-Coal Valley Community Unit School District 40
Rock Island–Milan School District 41
Riverdale Community Unit School District 100
Sherrard Community Unit School District 200
Rockridge Community Unit School District 300

Region 50: St. Clair ROE

St. Clair County

Lebanon Community Unit School District 9
Mascoutah Community Unit District 19
St. Libory Consolidated School District 30
Marissa Community Unit School District 40
New Athens Community Unit School District 60
Freeburg Community Consolidated School District 70
Freeburg Community High School District 77
Shiloh Village School District 85
O'Fallon Community Consolidated School District 90
Central School District 104
Pontiac William Holliday School District 105
Grant Community Consolidated School District 110
Wolf Branch School District 113
Whiteside School District 115
High Mount School District 116
Belleville School District 118
Belle Valley School District 119
Smithton Community Consolidated School District 130
Millstadt Community Consolidated School District 160
Harmony Emge School District 175
Signal Hill School District 181
Cahokia Community Unit School District 187
Brooklyn Unit School District 188
East St. Louis School District 189
Dupo Community Unit School District 196
Belleville Township High School District 201
O'Fallon Township High School District 203

Region 51: Menard/Sangamon ROE

Menard County

Greenview Community Unit School District 200
Porta Community Unit School District 202
Athens Community Unit School District 213

Sangamon County

Tri-City Community Unit School District 1
Rochester Community Unit School District 3A
Ball Chatham Community Unit School District 5
Pleasant Plains Community Unit School District 8
Auburn Community Unit School District 10
Pawnee Community Unit School District 11
Riverton Community Unit School District 14
Williamsville Community Unit School District 15
New Berlin Community Unit School District 16
Springfield School District 186

Region 53: Mason/Tazewell/Woodford ROE

Mason County

Havana Community Unit School District 126
Illini Central Community Unit School District 189
Midwest Central Community Unit School District 191

Tazewell County

District 50 Schools
Central School District 51
Washington School District 52
Creve Coeur School District 76
Robein School District 85
East Peoria School District 86
Rankin Community School District 98
North Pekin & Marquette Heights School District 102
Pekin Public School District 108
South Pekin School District 137
Pekin Community High School District 303
Washington Community High School District 308
East Peoria Community High School District 309
Spring Lake Community Consolidated School District 606
Deer Creek-Mackinaw Community Unit School District 701
Tremont Community Unit School District 702
Delavan Community Unit School District 703
Morton Community Unit School District 709

Woodford County

Metamora Community Consolidated School District 1
Riverview Community Consolidated School District 2
Fieldcrest Community Unit School District 6
El Paso-Gridley Community Unit School District 11
Lowpoint-Washburn Community Unit School District 21
Roanoke Benson Community Unit School District 60
Germantown Hills School District 69
Metamora Township High School District 122
Eureka Community Unit District 140

Region 54: Vermilion ROE

Vermilion County

Bismarck-Henning Community Unit School District 1 — grades 9-12 served by Bismarck-Henning-Rossville-Alvin Cooperative High School since 2017
Westville Community Unit School District 2
Georgetown-Ridge Farm Community Unit District 4
Rossville-Alvin Community Unit School District 7 — deactivated into tuition for grades 9-12 to Bismarck-Henning Community School District 1 and Hoopeston Area Community Unit School District 11 (until 2017) in 2005; grades 9-12 served by Bismarck-Henning-Rossville-Alvin Cooperative High School since 2017
Potomac Community Unit School District 10 — deactivated into tuition for grades 9-12 to Armstrong Township High School District 225 in 1994
Hoopeston Area Community Unit School District 11
Armstrong-Ellis Consolidated School District 61
Oakwood Community Unit School District 76
Danville Community Consolidated School District 118
Armstrong Township High School District 225
Salt Fork Community Unit School District 512

Region 56: Will ROE

Will County

Channahon School District 17
Troy Community Consolidated School District 30C
Homer Community Consolidated School District 33C
Laraway Community Consolidated School District 70C
Union School District 81
Rockdale School District 84
Joliet Public School District 86
Chaney-Monge School District 88
Richland School District 88A
Fairmont School District 89
Taft School District 90
Milne-Kelvin Grove District 91 — also known as Lockport School District 91
Will County School District 92
Manhattan School District 114
New Lenox School District 122
Frankfort Community Consolidated School District 157C
Mokena School District 159
Summit Hill School District 161
Beecher Community Unit School District 200U
Crete Monee Community Unit School District 201U
Plainfield Community Consolidated School District 202
Elwood Community Consolidated School District 203
Joliet Township High School District 204
Lockport Township High School District 205
Peotone Community Unit School District 207U
Wilmington School District 209-U
Lincoln-Way Community High School District 210
Reed Custer Community Unit School District 255U
Valley View Community Unit School District 365U

Region 60: Illinois Department of Corrections
Illinois Department of Juvenile Justice: School District 428

Defunct Regions
Region 02: Alexander/Johnson/Massac/Pulaski/Union ROE — became part of Region 21: Franklin/Williamson ROE for Johnson and Massac counties and Region 30: Jackson/Perry ROE for Alexander, Pulaski and Union counties in 2015, which were renamed Region 21: Franklin/Johnson/Massac/Williamson ROE and Region 30: Alexander/Jackson/Perry/Pulaski/Union ROE, respectively
Region 10: Christian/Montgomery ROE — became part of Region 03: Bond/Effingham/Fayette ROE in 2015, which was renamed Region 03: Bond/Christian/Effingham/Fayette/Montgomery ROE
Region 14: Suburban Cook ROE — split into Region 05: North Cook ISC 1, Region 06: West Cook ISC 2 and Region 07: South Cook ISC 4 in 2010
Region 22: Fulton/Schuyler ROE — became part of Region 26: Hancock/McDonough ROE in 2015, which was renamed Region 26: Fulton/Hancock/McDonough/Schulery ROE
Region 25: Hamilton/Jefferson ROE — became part of Region 13: Clinton/Marion/Washington ROE for Jefferson County and Region 20: Edwards/Gallatin/Hardin/Pope/Saline/Wabash/Wayne/White ROE for Hamilton County in 2015, which were renamed Region 13: Clinton/Jefferson/Marion/Washington ROE and Region 20: Edwards/Gallatin/Hamilton/Hardin/Pope/Saline/Wabash/Wayne/White ROE, respectively
Region 27: Henderson/Mercer/Warren ROE — became part of Region 33: Knox ROE in 2015, which was renamed Region 33: Henderson/Knox/Mercer/Warren ROE
Region 38: Logan/Mason/Menard ROE — became part of Region 17: Dewitt/Livingston/McLean ROE for Logan County, Region 51: Sangamon ROE for Menard County and Region 53: Tazewell ROE for Mason County in 2015, which were renamed Region 17: Dewitt/Livingston/Logan/McLean ROE, Region 51: Menard/Sangamon ROE and Region 53: Mason/Tazewell ROE, respectively
Region 43: Marshall/Putnam/Woodford ROE — became part of Region 35: LaSalle ROE for Marshall and Putnam Counties and Region 53: Tazewell ROE for Woodford County in 2015, which were renamed Region 35: LaSalle/Marshall/Putnam ROE and Region 53: Tazewell/Woodford ROE, respectively
Region 46: Brown/Cass/Morgan/Scott ROE — became part of Region 01: Adams/Pike ROE in 2015, which was renamed Region 01: Adams/PikeBrown/Cass/Morgan/Scott ROE
Region 55: Whiteside ROE — became part of Region 47: Lee/Ogle ROE in 2015, which was renamed Region 47: Lee/Ogle/Whiteside ROE

Defunct School Districts

Adams County

Chandlerville Community Unit School District 62 — consolidated with Ashland Community Unit School District 212 to form A-C Central Community Unit School District 262 in 1989
Ashland Community Unit School District 212 — consolidated with Chandlerville Community Unit School District 62 to form A-C Central Community Unit School District 262 in 1989

Bureau County

Kasbeer Community School District 23 — annexed into Princeton Elementary School District 115 in 1994
Cherry School District 92 — deactivated into tuition to Dimmick Community Consolidated School District 175 in 2014 and consolidated with that district to form a "new" Dimmick Community Consolidated School District 175 in 2017
Wyanet Elementary School District 126 — consolidated with Walnut Elementary School District 285, Manlius Unit School School District 305, Western Unit School District 306, Walnut High School District 508 and Wyanet High School District 510 to form Bureau Valley Community Unit School District 340 in 1995
Leepertown Community Consolidated School District 175 — annexed (dissolved) into Ladd Community Consolidated School District 94 and Princeton Elementary School District 115 in 2012
Walnut Elementary School District 285 — consolidated with Wyanet Elementary School District 126, Manlius Unit School School District 305, Western Unit School District 306, Walnut High School District 508 and Wyanet High School District 510 to from Bureau Valley Community Unit School District 340 in 1995
Tiskilwa Community Unit School District 300 — annexed into Princeton Elementary School District 115 and Princeton Township High School District 500 in 1996
Manlius Unit School School District 305 — consolidated with Wyanet Elementary School District 126, Walnut Elementary School District 285, Western Unit School District 306, Walnut High School District 508 and Wyanet High School District 510 to from Bureau Valley Community Unit School District 340 in 1995
Western Unit School District 306 — consolidated with Wyanet Elementary School District 126, Walnut Elementary School District 285, Manlius Unit School School District 305, Walnut High School District 508 and Wyanet High School District 510 to from Bureau Valley Community Unit School District 340 in 1995
Neponset Community Consolidated District 307 — deactivated into tuition for grades 9-12 to Bradford Community Unit School District 1 (until 2001), Bureau Valley Community Unit School District 340, Annawan Community Unit School District 226, Kewanee Community Unit School District 229 and Wethersfield Community Unit School District 230 in 1999 and annexed into Kewanee Community Unit School District 229 in 2011
Walnut High School District 508 — consolidated with Wyanet Elementary School District 126, Walnut Elementary School District 285, Manlius Unit School School District 305, Western Unit School District 306 and Wyanet High School District 510 to from Bureau Valley Community Unit School District 340 in 1995
Wyanet High School District 510 — consolidated with Wyanet Elementary School District 126, Walnut Elementary School District 285, Manlius Unit School School District 305, Western Unit School District 306 and Walnut High School District 508 to from Bureau Valley Community Unit School District 340 in 1995
Malden High School District 511 — annexed into Princeton Township High School District 500 in 1983

Calhoun County

Brussels Community High School District 37 — consolidated with Brussels-Richwood Community Consolidated School District 41 to form Brussels Community Unit School District 42 in 1988
Brussels-Richwood Community Consolidated School District 41 — colsolidated with Brussels Community High School District 37 to form Brussels Community Unit School District 42 in 1988

Carroll County

Savanna Community Unit School District 300 — consolidated with Thomson Community Unit School District 301 and Mount Carroll Community Unit School District 304 to form West Carroll Community Unit School District 314 in 2005
Thomson Community Unit School District 301 — consolidated with Savanna Community Unit School District 300 and Mount Carroll Community Unit School District 304 to form West Carroll Community Unit School District 314 in 2005
Shannon Community Unit School District 303 — consolidated with Lanark Community Unit School District 305 to form Eastland Community Unit School District 308 in 1986
Mount Carroll Community Unit School District 304 — consolidated with Savanna Community Unit School District 300 and Thomson Community Unit School District 301 to form West Carroll Community Unit School District 314 in 2005
Lanark Community Unit School District 305 — consolidated with Shannon Community Unit School District 303 to form Eastland Community Unit School District 308 in 1986
Milledgeville Community Unit School District 312 — annexed into Chadwick Community Unit School District 399 in 1989, which was renamed Chadwick-Milledgeville Community Unit School District 399

Champaign County

A.B.L. Community Unit School District 6 (Allerton-Broadlands-Longview) — consolidated with Homer Community Consolidated School District 208 to form Heritage Community Unit School District 8 in 1989
Prairieview Community Consolidated School District 192 — consolidated with Ogden Community Consolidated School District 212 to form Prairieview-Ogden Community Consolidated School District 197 in 2006
Homer Community Consolidated School District 208 — consolidated with A.B.L. Community Unit School District 6 to form Heritage Community Unit School District 8 in 1989
Ogden Community Consolidated School District 212 — consolidated with Prairieview Community Consolidated School District 192 to form Prairieview-Ogden Community Consolidated School District 197 in 2006
Penfield Community Consolidated School District 224 — annexed into Armstrong Ellis Community School District 61, Gifford Community Consolidated School District 188 and Prairieview Community Consolidated District 192 in 1991

Christian County

Mount Auburn Community Unit School District 5 — deactivated into tuition for grades 9-12 to Taylorville Community Unit School District 3 in 1990 and annexed into that district in 1992
Stonington Community Unit School District 7 — annexed into Taylorville Community Unit School District 3 in 1992
Assumption Community Unit School District 9 — consolidated with Moweaqua Community School District 6A to from Central A&M Community Unit School District 21 in 1992
Kincaid School District 182 — consolidated with Tovey School District 183 and South Fork School District 310 to form South Fork School District 14 in 1984
Tovey School District 183 — consolidated with Kincaid School District 182 and South Fork School District 310 to form South Fork School District 14 in 1984
South Fork School District 310 — consolidated with Kincaid School District 182 and Tovey School District 183 to from South Fork School District 14 in 1984

Clark County

Casey Community Unit School District C-1 — consolidated with Westfield School District 105 and Westfield Township High School District 201 to form Casey-Westfield Community Unit School District C-4 in 1985
Westfield School District 105 — consolidated with Casey Community Unit School District C-1 and Westfield Township High School District 201 to form Casey-Westfield Community Unit School District C-4 in 1985
Westfield Township High School District 201 — consolidated with Casey Community Unit School District C-1 and Westfield School District 105 to form Casey-Westfield Community Unit School District C-4 in 1985

Cook County
Lemont Community Consolidated School District 113 — consolidated with Bromberek School District 65 to form Lemont-Bromberek Combined School District 113A in 1990

DeKalb County

Waterman Community Unit School District 431 — annexed into Indian Creek Community Unit School District 425 in 1993
Malta Community Unit District 433 — annexed into DeKalb Community Unit School District 428 in 2000

DeWitt County

Wapella Community Unit School District 5 — annexed into Clinton Community School District 15 in 1994
Farmer City/Mansfield Community Unit School District 17 — consolidated with Bellflower Community Consolidated School District 88 and Bellflower Township High School District 311 to form Blue Ridge Community Unit School District 18 in 1985

Douglas County

Newman Community Unit School District 303 — consolidated with Shiloh School District 2 to form Shiloh Community Unit School District 1 in 1994

DuPage County

McAuley School District No. 27 (1857–1992) — annexed into West Chicago Elementary School District 33
Bromberek School District 65 — consolidated with Lemont Community Consolidated School District 113 to form Lemont-Bromberek Combined School District 113A in 1990
Puffer Hefty School District 69 — annexed (dissolved) into Downers Grove School District 58 in 2004

Edgar County

Shiloh School District 2 — consolidated with Newman Community Unit School District 303 to form Shiloh Community Unit School District 1 in 1994

Fayette County
LaGrove Community Unit School District 206 — consolidated with Kinmundy Alma Community Unit School District 301 to form South Central Community Unit School District 401 in 1989

Ford County

Gibson City Community Unit School District 1 — consolidated with Melvin-Sibley Community Unit School District 4 to form Gibson City-Melvin-Sibley Community Unit School District 5 in 1993
Paxton Community Unit School District 2 — consolidated with Buckley-Loda Community Unit School District 8 to form Paxton-Buckley-Loda Community Unit School District 10 in 1990
Melvin-Sibley Community Unit School District 4 — consolidated with Gibson City Community Unit School District 1 to form Gibson City-Melvin-Sibley Community Unit School District 5 in 1993
Ford Central Community Unit School District 8 — annexed into Tri-Point Community Unit School District 6J, Prairie Central Community Unit School District 8, Iroquois West Community Unit School District 10 and Paxton-Buckley-Loda Community Unit School District 10 in 1992

Franklin County

Mulkeytown Community Consolidated School District 32 — annexed into Christopher School District 34 in 1987
Christopher School District 34 — consolidated with Christopher Community High School District 38 to form Christopher Unit School District 99 in 1999
Christopher Community High School District 38 — consolidated with Christopher School District 34 to form Christopher Unit School District 99 in 1999
Thompsonville School District 62 — consolidated with Thompsonville Community High School District 112 to form Thompsonville Community Unit School District 174 in 2007
Logan Community Consolidated School District 110 — annexed (dissolved) into Benton Community Consolidated School District 47 and Thompsonville School District 62 in 2005
Thompsonville Community High School District 112 — consolidated with Thompsonville School District 62 to form Thompsonville Community Unit School District 174 in 2007

Fulton County

Saint David School District 87 — consolidated with Lewistown School District 141, Prichard Clark Community Elementary School District 340 and Lewistown Community High School District 341 to form Lewistown Community Unit School District 97 in 1997
Dunfermline School District 88 — annexed into Canton-Union School District 66 in 1994
Lewistown School District 141 — consolidated with Saint David School District 87, Prichard Clark Community Elementary School District 340 and Lewistown Community High School District 341 to form Lewistown Community Unit School District 97 in 1997
Avon Community Unit School District 176 — consolidated with Abingdon Community Unit School District 217 to form Abingdon-Avon Community Unit School District 276 in 2013
Farmington East Community Unit School District 324 — consolidated with Yates City Community Unit School District 207 to form Farmington Central Community Unit School District 265 in 1987
South Fulton Community Consolidated School District 330 — annexed into Lewistown School District 141 in 1986
Prichard Clark Community Elementary School District 340 — consolidated with Saint David School District 87, Lewistown School District 141 and Lewistown Community High School District 341 to form Lewistown Community Unit School District 97 in 1997
Lewistown Community High School District 341 — consolidated with Saint David School District 87, Lewistown School District 141 and Prichard Clark Community Elementary School District 340 to form Lewistown Community Unit School District 97 in 1997

Gallatin County

North Gallatin Community Unit School District 1 — consolidated with Southeast Gallatin Community Unit School District 2 and Equality Community Unit School District 4 to form Gallatin Community Unit School District 7 in 1987
Southeast Gallatin Community Unit School District 2 — consolidated with North Gallatin Community Unit School District 1 and Equality Community Unit School District 4 to form Gallatin Community Unit School District 7 in 1987
Equality Community Unit School District 4 — consolidated with North Gallatin Community Unit School District 1 and Southeast Gallatin Community Unit School District 2 to form Gallatin Community Unit School District 7 in 1987

Grundy County

Mazon-Verona-Kinsman Community Unit School District 2 — annexed and converted into Mazon-Verona-Kinsman Elementary School District 2C and Seneca Township High School District 160 in 1990
Goodfarm Community Consolidated School District 35C — annexed into Dwight Common School District 232 in 1990

Hancock County

Plymouth Community Consolidated School District 319 — annexed into Southeastern Community Unit School District 337 in 1992
LaHarpe Community Unit School District 335 — converted into LaHarpe Community School District 347 and Illini West High School District 307 in 2007
Dallas Community Unit School District 336 — deactivated into tuition for grades 9-12 to Nauvoo-Colusa Community School District 325 in 2001 and converted into Dallas Elementary School District 327 and Illini West High School District 307 in 2007
Carthage Community Unit School District 338 — converted into Carthage Elementary School District 317 and Illini West High School District 307 in 2007

Henderson County

Union Community Unit School District 115 — consolidated with Southern Community School District 120 to form West Central Community Unit School District 235 in 2005
Southern Community School District 120 — consolidated with Union Community Unit School District 115 to form West Central Community Unit School District 235 in 2005

Henry County
Atkinson Community Unit School District 233 — annexed into Geneseo Community Unit School District 228 in 1988

Iroquois County

Onarga Community Unit School District 1 — consolidated with Gilman-Danforth Community Unit School District 2 to form Iroquois West Community Unit School District 10 in 1983
Gilman-Danforth Community Unit School District 2 — consolidated with Onarga Community Unit School District 1 to form Iroquois West Community Unit School District 10 in 1983
Sheldon Community Unit School District 5 — annexed (dissolved) into Milford Township High School District 233 and Milford Community Consolidated School District 280 in 2003
Wellington Community Unit School District 7 — annexed into Hoopeston Community Unit School District 11, Milford Township High School District 233 and Milford Community Consolidated School District 280 in 1987
Buckley-Loda Community Unit School District 8 — consolidated with Paxton Community Unit School District 2 to form Paxton-Buckley-Loda Community Unit School District 10 in 1990
Milford Township High School District 233 — consolidated with Milford Community Consolidated School District 280 to form Milford Area Public Schools District 124 in 2014
Crescent-Iroquois High School District 252 — consolidated with Crescent City Community Consolidated School District 275 to form Crescent Iroquois Community Unit School District 249 in 2005
Stockland Community Consolidated School District 253 — annexed into Milford Township High School District 233 and Milford Community Consolidated School District 280 in 1988
Crescent City Community Consolidated School District 275 — consolidated with Crescent-Iroquois High School District 252 to form Crescent Iroquois Community Unit School District 249 in 2005
Milford Community Consolidated School District 280 — consolidated with Milford Township High School District 233 to form Milford Area Public Schools District 124 in 2014
Bryce-Ash Grove Community Consolidated School District 284 — annexed into Milford Community Consolidated School District 280 in 1994

Jackson County

Glendale Community Consolidated School District 160 — annexed into Carbondale Elementary School District 95 in 1987
Mississippi Valley Community Unit School District 166 — annexed into Trico Community Unit School District 176 and Murphysboro Community Unit School District 186 in 1991

Jefferson County

Woodlawn Community Consolidated School District 4 — hybrid formed with Woodlawn Community High School District 205 into Woodlawn Unit School District 209 in 2015
Dodds Community Consolidated School District 7 — consolidated with Ina Community Consolidated School District 8 to form Spring Garden School District 178 in 2015
Ina Community Consolidated School District 8 — consolidated with Dodds Community Consolidated School District 7 to form Spring Garden School District 178 in 2015
Bluford Community Consolidated School District 114 — hybrid formed with Webber Township High School District 204 into Bluford Unit School District 318 in 2015
Webber Township High School District 204 — hybrid formed with Bluford Community Consolidated School District 114 into Bluford Unit School District 318 in 2015
Woodlawn Community High School District 205 — hybrid formed with Woodlawn Community Consolidated School District 4 into Woodlawn Unit School District 209 in 2015

Jo Daviess County

Elizabeth Community School District 208 — consolidated with Hanover Community School District 212 to form River Ridge Community Unit School District 210 in 1985
Hanover Community School District 212 — consolidated with Elizabeth Community School District 208 to form River Ridge Community Unit School District 210 in 1985

Johnson County

Goreville School District 18 — consolidated with Goreville Township High School District 71 to form Goreville Community Unit District 1 in 1987
Goreville Township High School District 71 — consolidated with Goreville School District 18 to form Goreville Community Unit District 1 in 1987

Kankakee County
R.U.C.E. Community Unit School District 3 (Reddick, Union Hill, Campus, and Essex) — annexed into Herscher Community Unit School District 2 in 1988

Knox County

Yates City Community Unit School District 207 — consolidated with Farmington East Community Unit School District 324 to form Farmington Central Community Unit School District 265 in 1987
Abingdon Community Unit School District 217 — consolidated with Avon Community Unit School District 176 to form Abingdon-Avon Community Unit School District 276 in 2013

Lake County

Lotus School District 10 — annexed into Fox Lake School District 114 in 1990
Newport Community Consolidated School District 11 — annexed into Beach Park Community Consolidated School District 3 in 1986
Avon Center School District 47 — annexed into Grayslake Community Consolidated School District 46 in 1988
North Chicago Elementary School District 64 — consolidated with North Chicago High School District 123 to form North Chicago School District 187 in 1989
Highland Park School District 107 — consolidated with Highland Park School District 108 and Highwood-Highland Park School District 111 to form North Shore School District 112 in 1993
Highland Park School District 108 — consolidated with Highland Park School District 107 and Highwood-Highland Park School District 111 to form North Shore School District 112 in 1993
Highwood-Highland Park School District 111 — consolidated with Highland Park School District 107 and Highland Park School District 108 to form North Shore School District 112 in 1993
North Chicago High School District 123 — consilidated with North Chicago Elementary School District 64 to form North Chicago School District 187 in 1989

LaSalle County

Lostant Community Consolidated School District 25 — consolidated with Lostant Community High School District 400 to form Lostant Community Unit School District 425 in 1993
Eagle Elementary School District 43 — consolidated with Streator Elementary School District 45 to from Streator Elementary School District 44 in 1989
Streator Elementary School District 45 — consolidated with Eagle Elementary School District 43 to from Streator Elementary School District 44 in 1989
Otter Creek-Hyatt School District 56 — annexed into Allen Township Community Consolidated School District 65 in 2003, which was renamed Allen-Otter Creek Community Consolidated School District 65
Minonk-Dana-Rutland Community Unit School District 108 — consolidated with Wenona Community Unit School District 1 and Toluca Community Unit School District 2 to from Fieldcrest Community Unit School District 6 in 1992
John F. Kennedy Community Consolidated School District 129 — annexed into Oglesby Elementary School District 125 in 1993
Utica School District 135 — annexed into Waltham Community Consolidated School District 185 in 2003
Marseilles Community Unit School District 155 — annexed and converted into Ottawa Township High School District 140 and Marseilles Elementary School District 150 in 1990
Ophir Community Consolidated School District 235 — annexed into Mendota Community Consolidated School District 289 in 1998
Tonica High School District 360 — annexed into LaSalle-Peru Township High School District 120 in 1990
Lostant Community High School District 400 — consolidated with Lostant Community Consolidated School District 25 to form Lostant Community Unit School District 425 in 1993

Lee County
Nelson Public School District 8 — consolidated with East Coloma School District 12 to form East Coloma-Nelson Consolidated Elementary School District 20 in 2013

Livingston County

Chatsworth Community Unit School District 1 — consolidated with Forrest Strawn Wing Community Unit School District 2 and Fairbury-Cropsey Community Unit School District 3 to form Prairie Central Community Unit School District 8 in 1985
Forrest Strawn Wing Community Unit School District 2 — consolidated with Chatsworth Community Unit School District 1 and Fairbury-Cropsey Community Unit School District 3 to form Prairie Central Community Unit School District 8 in 1985
Fairbury-Cropsey Community Unit School District 3 — consolidated with Chatsworth Community Unit School District 1 and Forrest Strawn Wing Community Unit School District 2 to form Prairie Central Community Unit School District 8 in 1985
Flanagan Community Unit School District 4 — hybrid formed with Cornell Community High School District 70 into Flanagan-Cornell Unit 74, in 2008
Saunemin Community Unit School District 6 — annexed and converted into Pontiac Township High School District 90 and Saunemin Community Consolidated School District 438 in 1987
Cornell Community High School District 70 — deactivated into tuition to Flanagan Community Unit School District 4 in 1987 and hybrid formed with that district into Flanagan-Cornell Unit 74 in 2008
Odell Community High School District 160 — annexed into Pontiac Township High School District 90 in 1987
Pontiac Esmen Community Consolidated School District 430 — annexed into Pontiac Community Consolidated School District 429 in 1997
Sunbury Community Consolidated School District 431 — annexed into Allen Township Community Consolidated School District 65, Dwight Community Consolidated School District 232, Cornell Community Consolidated School District 426 and Odell Community Consolidated School District 435 in 1991
Owego Community Consolidated School District 434 — annexed into Pontiac Community Consolidated School District 429 in 1993

Logan County

Beason Community Consolidated School District 17 — annexed into Chester-East Lincoln Community Consolidated School District 61 in 1994
New Holland-Middletown Community Unit School District 22 — annexed and converted into New Holland-Middletown Elementary School District 88 and Lincoln Community High School District 404 in 1988
Broadwell Community Consolidated School District 68 — consolidated with West Lincoln Community Consolidated School District 72 to form West Lincoln-Broadwell Elementary School District 92 in 1992
West Lincoln Community Consolidated School District 72 — consolidated with Broadwell Community Consolidated School District 68 to form West Lincoln-Broadwell Elementary School District 92 in 1992

Macon County

Macon Community Unit School District 5 — consolidated with Blue Mound-Boody Community Unit School District 10 to form Meridian Community Unit School District 15 in 1994
Niantic-Harristown Community Unit School District 6 — consolidated with Illiopolis Community Unit School District 12 to form Sangamon Valley Community Unit School District 9 in 2004
Blue Mound-Boody Community Unit School District 10 — consolidated with Macon Community Unit School District 5 to form Meridian Community Unit School District 15 in 1994

Macoupin County

Girard Community Unit School District 3 — consolidated with Virden Community Unit School District 4 to form North Mac Community Unit School District 34 in 2010
Virden Community Unit School District 4 — consolidated with Girard Community Unit School District 3 to form North Mac Community Unit School District 34 in 2010

Madison County

Livingston Community Consolidated School District 4 — annexed into Staunton Community Unit School District 6 in 2004
Worden Community Unit School District 16 — annexed into Edwardsville Community Unit School District 7 in 1988

Marion County

Odin School District 122 — consolidated with Odin Community High School District 700 to form Odin Public School District 722 in 2011
Kinmundy Alma Community Unit School District 301 — consolidated with LaGrove Community Unit School District 206 to form South Central Community Unit School District 401 in 1989
Odin Community High School District 700 — consolidated with Odin School District 122 to form Odin Public School District 722 in 2011

Marshall County

Wenona Community Unit School District 1 — consolidated with Toluca Community Unit School District 2 and Minonk-Dana-Rutland Community Unit School District 108 to from Fieldcrest Community Unit School District 6 in 1992
Toluca Community Unit School District 2 — consolidated with Toluca Community Unit School District 2 and Minonk-Dana-Rutland Community Unit School District 108 to from Fieldcrest Community Unit School District 6 in 1992
Sparland Unit School District 3 — consolidated with Mid-County Unit School District 4 to form Midland Community Unit School District 7 in 1995
Mid-County Unit School District 4 — consolidated with Sparland Unit School District 3 to form Midland Community Unit School District 7 in 1995
Henry-Senachwine Community School District 20 — consolidated with Henry Community Consolidated School District 35 and Senachwine Community School District 534 to form Henry-Senachwine Community Unit School District 5 in 1989
Henry Community Consolidated School District 35 — consolidated with Henry-Senachwine Community School District 20 and Senachwine Community School District 534 to form Henry-Senachwine Community Unit School District 5 in 1989

Mason County

Easton Community Unit School District 121 — consolidated with San Jose Community Unit School District 122 and Mason City Community Unit School District 123 to form Illini Central Community Unit School District 189 in 1989
San Jose Community Unit School District 122 — consolidated with Easton Community Unit School District 121 and Mason City Community Unit School District 123 to form Illini Central Community Unit School District 189 in 1989
Mason City Community Unit School District 123 — consolidated with Easton Community Unit School District 121 and San Jose Community Unit School District 122 to form Illini Central Community Unit School District 189 in 1989
Forman Community Unit School District 124 — consolidated with Green Valley Community High School District 306 and Green Valley Community Consolidated School District 695 to form Midwest Central Community Unit School District 191 in 1991
Balyki Community Unit School District 125 — annexed into Havana Community Unit School District 126 in 1992

Massac County

Maple Grove Community Consolidated School District 17 — consolidated with Joppa Community High School District 21 to form Joppa-Maple Grove Unit District 38 in 1987
Joppa Community High School District 21 — consolidated with Maple Grove Community Consolidated School District 17 to form Joppa-Maple Grove Unit District 38 in 1987

McDonough County

Industry Community Unit School District 165 — consolidated with Schuyler County Community Unit School District 1 to form Schuyler-Industry Community Unit School District 5 in 2005
Northwest Community Unit School District 175 — consolidated with Colchester Community Unit School District 180 to form West Prairie Community Unit School District 103 in 2003
Colchester Community Unit School District 180 — consolidated with Northwest Community Unit School District 175 to form West Prairie Community Unit School District 103 in 2003

McHenry County

Union Community School District 8 — consolidated with Hawthorn Community Consolidated School District 17 and Marengo Community School District 140 to form Marengo-Union Elementary School District 165 in 1987
Spring Grove School District 11 — consolidated with Richmond Community School District 13 to form Nippersink School District 2 in 2000
Richmond Community School District 13 — consolidated with Spring Grove School District 11 to form Nippersink School District 2 in 2000
Hawthorn Community Consolidated School District 17 — consolidated with Union Community School District 8 and Marengo Community School District 140 to form Marengo-Union Elementary School District 165 in 1987
Marengo Community School District 140 — consolidated with Union Community School District 8 and Hawthorn Community Consolidated School District 17 to form Marengo-Union Elementary School District 165 in 1987

McLean County

Octavia Community Unit School District 8 — consolidated with Saybrook-Arrowsmith Community Unit School District 11 to form Ridgeview Community Unit School District 19 in 1989
Chenoa Community Unit School District 9 — annexed (dissolved) into Prairie Central Community Unit School District 8 in 2004
Gridley Community Unit School District 10 — consolidated with El Paso Community Unit School District 375 to form El Paso-Gridley Community Unit School District 11 in 2004
Saybrook-Arrowsmith Community Unit School District 11 — consolidated with Octavia Community Unit School District 8 to form Ridgeview Community Unit School District 19 in 1989
Bellflower Community Consolidated School District 88 — consolidated with Farmer City/Mansfield Community Unit School District 17 and Bellflower Township High School District 311 to form Blue Ridge Community Unit School District 18 in 1985
Bellflower Township High School District 311 — consolidated with Farmer City/Mansfield Community Unit School District 17 and Bellflower Community Consolidated School District 88 to form Blue Ridge Community Unit School District 18 in 1985

Mercer County

Aledo Community Unit School District 201 — consolidated with Westmer Community Unit School District 203 to form Mercer County School District 404 in 2009
Winola Community Unit School District 202 — annexed into Sherrard Community Unit School District 200 in 1988
Westmer Community Unit School District 203 — consolidated with Aledo Community Unit School District 201 to form Mercer County School District 404 in 2009

Montgomery County
Witt Community Unit School District 66 — annexed into Hillsboro Community Unit School District 3 in 1997

Moultrie County

Bethany Community Unit School District 301 — consolidated with Findlay Community Unit School District 2 to form Okaw Valley Community Unit School District 302 in 2001
Lovington Community Unit School District 303 — annexed into Arthur Community Unit School District 305 in 2012

Ogle County

Leaf River Community Unit School District 70 — annexed into Forrestville Valley Community Unit School District 221 in 1989
Mount Morris Community Unit School District 261 — annexed into Oregon Community Unit School District 220 in 1994

Peoria County
Bellevue Elementary School District 152 — annexed into Norwood Elementary School District 63 in 1990

Perry County

Tamaroa Community High School District 102 — annexed into Pinckneyville Community High School District 101 in 1988
Community Consolidated School District 211 (Tamaroa) — annexed into Community Consolidated School District 204 in 1993
Pinckneyville School District 212 — annexed into Pinckneyville School District 50 in 1986

Piatt County
Atwood Hammond Community Unit School District 39 — annexed into Arthur Community Unit School District 305 in 2014

Pike County

Barry Community United School District 1 — consolidated with West Pike Community Unit School District 2 to form Western Community Unit School District 12 in 2007
West Pike Community Unit School District 2 — consolidated with Barry Community United School District 1 to form Western Community Unit School District 12 in 2007
Perry School District 57 — annexed into Griggsville Community Unit School District 4 in 1995, which was renamed Griggsville-Perry Community Unit School District 4
Perry Community High School District 172 — annexed into Griggsville Community Unit School District 4 in 1995, which was renamed Griggsville-Perry Community Unit School District 4

Putnam County
Senachwine Community School District 534 — consolidated with Henry-Senachwine Community School District 20 and Henry Community Consolidated School District 35 to form Henry-Senachwine Community Unit School District 5 in 1989

Randolph County
Kaskaskia Community School District 124 — annexed into Chester Community Unit School District 139 in 1989

Richland County
West Richland Community Unit School District 2 — annexed (dissolved) into East Richland Community Unit School District 1 in 2014, which was renamed Richland County Community Unit School District 1

Sangamon County

Illiopolis Community Unit School District 12 — consolidated with Niantic-Harristown Community Unit School District 6 to form Sangamon Valley Community Unit School District 9 in 2004
Divernon Community Unit School District 13 — annexed (dissolved) into Auburn Community Unit School District 10 in 2007

Schuyler County
Schuyler County Community Unit School District 1 — consolidated with Industry Community Unit School District 165 to form Schuyler-Industry Community Unit School District 5 in 2005

Shelby County

Findlay Community Unit School District 2 — consolidated with Bethany Community Unit School District 301 to form Okaw Valley Community Unit School District 302 in 2001
Tower Hill Community Unit School District 6 — annexed into Pana Community School District 8 in 2003
Moweaqua Community School District 6A — consolidated with Assumption Community Unit School District 9 to form Central A&M Community Unit District 21 in 1992
Tower Hill Community Consolidated School District 10 — consolidated with Tower Hill Community High School District 185 to form Tower Hill Community Unit School District 6 in 1998
Cowden-Herrick Community Consolidated District 11 — consolidated with Cowden-Herrick Community High School District 188 to form Cowden-Herrick Community Unit School District 3A in 1998
Tower Hill Community High School District 185 — consolidated with Tower Hill Community Consolidated School District 10 to form Tower Hill Community Unit School District 6 in 1998
Cowden-Herrick Community High School District 188 — consolidated with Cowden-Herrick Community Consolidated District 11 to form Cowden-Herrick Community Unit School District 3A in 1998

Stark County

Toulon-LaFayette Community Unit School District 2 — consolidated with Wyoming Community Consolidated School District 27 and Wyoming Community High School District 71 to form Stark County Community Unit School District 100 in 1992
Wyoming Community Consolidated School District 27 — consolidated with Toulon-LaFayette Community Unit School District 2 and Wyoming Community High School District 71 to form Stark County Community Unit School District 100 in 1992
Valley Community Consolidated School District 45 — annexed into Wyoming Community Consolidated School District 27 in 1991
Wyoming Community High School District 71 — consolidated with Toulon-LaFayette Community Unit School District 2 and Wyoming Community Consolidated School District 27 to form Stark County Community Unit School District 100 in 1992

Tazewell County

Green Valley Community High School District 306 — consolidated with Forman Community Unit School District 124 and Green Valley Community Consolidated School District 695 to form Midwest Central Community Unit School District 191 in 1991
Pleasant View Community School District 622 — annexed into Washington School District 52 in 1994
Green Valley Community Consolidated School District 695 — consolidated with Forman Community Unit School District 124 and Green Valley Community High School District 306 to form Midwest Central Community Unit School District 191 in 1991

Vermilion County

Georgetown Community Unit School District 3 — consolidated with Ridge Farm Community Unit School District 9 to form Georgetown-Ridge Farm Community Unit District 4 in 1987
Catlin Community Unit School District 5 — consolidated with Jamaica Community Unit School District 12 to form Salt Fork Community Unit School District 512 in 2015
Rankin School District 8 — annexed into Hoopeston Community Unit School District 11 in 1992
Ridge Farm Community Unit School District 9 — consolidated with Georgetown Community Unit School District 3 to form Georgetown-Ridge Farm Community Unit District 4 in 1987
Jamaica Community Unit School District 12 — consolidated with Catlin Community Unit School District 5 to form Salt Fork Community Unit School District 512 in 2015
Rankin Township High School District 223 — deactivated into tuition to Hoopeston Community Unit School District 11 in 1987 and annexed into that district in 1992

Warren County

Monmouth Unit School District 38 — consolidated with Roseville Community Unit School District 200 to form Monmouth-Roseville Community Unit School District 238 in 2005
Roseville Community Unit School District 200 — consolidated with Monmouth Unit School District 38 to form Monmouth-Roseville Community Unit School District 238 in 2005
Warren Community Unit School District 222 — consolidated with Alexis Community Unit School District 400 to form United Community Unit School District 304 om 2004
Yorkwood Community Unit School District 225 — annexed into United Community Unit School District 304 in 2007
Alexis Community Unit School District 400 — consolidated with Warren Community Unit School District 222 to form United Community Unit School District 304 om 2004

Washington County
Hoyleton Consolidated School District 29 — annexed (dissolved) into Nashville CCSD 49 in 2015

Wayne County

Mill Shoals Community Consolidated School District 18 — annexed into New Hope Community Consolidated School District 6 in 1991
Merriam Community Consolidated School District 19 — annexed into New Hope Community Consolidated School District 6 and Fairfield Public School District 112 in 2004

White County

Crossville Community Unit School District 2 — annexed into Carmi-White County Community Unit School District 5 in 1988
Enfield Community Unit School District 4 — annexed into Norris City-Omaha Community Unit School District 3 in 1985, which was renamed Norris City-Omaha-Enfield Community Unit School District 3

Whiteside County

Tampico Community Unit School District 4 — annexed into Prophetstown-Lyndon Community Unit School District 3 in 1996, which was renamed Prophetstown-Lyndon-Tampico Community Unit School District 3
East Coloma School District 12 — consolidated with Nelson Public School District 8 to form East Coloma-Nelson Consolidated Elementary School District 20 in 2013
Riverdale School District 14 — annexed (dissolved) into Rock Falls Elementary School District 13 in 2012

Woodford County
El Paso Community Unit School District 375 — consolidated with Gridley Community Unit School District 10 to form El Paso-Gridley Community Unit School District 11 in 2004

See also
 Illinois Community College System — includes information on community college districts (formerly known as junior college districts)

Notes

References

External links
Illinois School Directories at Illinois State Board of Education
Interactive Illinois Report Card
Schools and Colleges Search at National Center for Education Statistics

Illinois education-related lists
Illinois geography-related lists
Illinois